Kherson (U210) was a Grisha I-class anti-submarine corvette of the Ukrainian Navy. Prior to joining the Ukrainian Navy she was a former Soviet Navy corvette named MPK-52.

Development and design 

The 1124P project corvette (NATO reporting name: Grisha I class, Soviet classification: MPK-147 class ) were intended to counter enemy submarines in nearby area of ​​naval bases, ports and scattered berths, on the deployment of naval forces to carry out anti-submarine surveillance and protection of ships and vessels at sea.

Project 1124 of the first series were armed with SAM Osa-M in the bow of the hull. One twin AK-725 gun was located in the stern. Control of firing AK-725 was carried out by the MR-103 Leopard radar with a maximum detection range of 40 km, which was also located on the stern superstructure. The MR-302 Rubka radar was installed as a radar for detecting air and surface targets on the ship's mast. The basis of the sonar consisted of submersible GAS MG-322 Argun (operated in echo direction-finding mode) and lowered GAS MG-339 Shelon in the stern superstructure, which operated only in the "stop" mode. The basis of anti-submarine weapons were located two twin torpedo tubes for DTA-5E-1124 and two RBU-6000 on the bow of the ship's superstructure.

Construction of small anti-submarine ships on Project 1124 began in 1967 at the Zelenodolsk Shipyard. A total of twelve ships of this project were built, after which they were replaced by the corvettes of Project 1124 of the second series (Grisha-III according to NATO reporting name).

Construction and career 
The corvette MPK-52 was laid down on 30 October 1968 at the Kuznya na Rybalskomu, Kyiv. The ship was launched on 30 May 1971. The corvette was commissioned on 31 December 1971.

MPK-52 was a member of the 400th division of anti-submarine ships of the 68th brigade of ships of the Black Sea Fleet, which took an active part in training and combat activities of the fleet. Navy of the USSR for anti-submarine training. As a result of almost a day of persecution, the Turkish submarine was forced to enter the territorial waters of Turkey and ascend.

During the division of the Black Sea Fleet of the USSR, the ship was intended to be handed over to the Ukrainian Navy, which was why it was stolen in a short period of time.

Despite the unsatisfactory technical condition, on 1 August 1997, the ship was handed over to the Ukrainian Navy.  Few years later due to lack of funds for repairs, the corvette could not be put in service. On 8 September 1999, MPK-52 was expelled from the Ukrainian Navy and disposed of.

Pennant numbers

References 

Grisha-class corvettes
Kherson
1971 ships
Kherson
Ships built in the Soviet Union